Bien De Moor (born 11 June 1962) is a Belgian actress.

Born in De Pinte, she graduated at the drama course of "Studio Herman Teirlinck" in Antwerp.

Her role of Solange in the stage play De Meiden ("The Girl") gained her a Theo d'Or in 2005. For her performance in the controversial film Code Blue she was awarded as best actress at the Seville European Film Festival.

The short film Vera by Dutch filmmaker Thomas Korthals Altes, with Bien De Moor in the lead role, won the Grand Prix Award and the Best Short Award at the 2010 Tokyo Short Shorts Film Festival.

Selected filmography 

 1991: Elias
 2011: Code Blue
 2019: Nocturne

References

External links 
 

1962 births
Living people
Flemish film actresses
Flemish television actresses
Flemish stage actresses
People from East Flanders
21st-century Belgian actresses